Lashed-lug boats are ancient boat-building techniques of the Austronesian peoples. It is characterized by the use of sewn holes and later dowels ("treenails") to stitch planks edge-to-edge onto a dugout keel and solid carved wood pieces that form the caps for the prow and stern. The planks are further lashed together and to ribs with fiber ropes wrapped around protruding carved lugs on the inside surfaces. Unlike carvel construction, the shell of the boat is created first, prior to being fastened to the ribs. The seams between planks are also sealed with absorbent tapa bark and fiber that expands when wet or caulked with resin-based preparations.

Lashed-lug construction techniques are found in all the traditional boats of Maritime Southeast Asia, Melanesia, Madagascar, Micronesia, and Polynesia, and was one of the early maritime boat-building techniques that allowed the rapid expansion of the Austronesian peoples throughout the islands of the Indo-Pacific starting at 3000 to 1500 BCE.

The lashed-lug technique of Island South-east Asia is considered to be very similar to that found in archaeological remains of some Scandinavian boats. This is considered to be a case of independent invention of one of a limited number of solutions to the same boat-building problem.

Basic construction
The lashed-lug technique remains remarkably homogeneous throughout the entirety of the Austronesian range. The keel and the base of the hull is a simple dugout canoe. Planks are then added gradually to the keel, either by sewing fiber ropes through drilled holes or through the use of internal dowels ("treenails") on the plank edges.

The most distinctive aspect of lashed-lug boats are the lugs (also called "cleats" by some authors). These are a series of carved protrusions with holes bored into them on the inside surfaces of the planks  which are then lashed tightly together with the lugs on the adjacent planks and to ribs using plaited fiber (usually rattan, coir, and other palm fibers).

The seams of the planks were commonly caulked with resin-based pastes made from various plants as well as tapa bark and fibers which would expand when wet, further tightening joints and making the hull watertight. The ends of the boat are capped with single pieces of carved Y-shaped wooden blocks or posts which are attached to the planks in the same way.

Once the shell of the boat is completed, the ribs are then built and lashed to the lugs to further strengthen the structure of the ship, while still retaining the inherent flexibility of the outer hull. The outriggers, when present, are attached with similar lashings to the main hull.

The smallest Austronesian boat (excluding rafts and dugout canoes) characteristically have five parts all put together using the lashed-lug technique. These consist of the dugout keel, two planks that form the strakes, and the end caps for the prow and the stern. Larger ships usually differed in the number of planks used for the strakes, but the construction techniques remain the same.

Archaeology

Lashed-lug techniques are distinctively Austronesian and are different enough from the shipbuilding techniques of South Asia, the Middle East, and China, that they can be used to readily identify ships as being Austronesian. Despite this, some lashed-lug Austronesian shipwrecks have been misidentified as Indian or Chinese due to their cargo in the past. Non-Austronesian ships also later adopted lashed-lug techniques from contact with Austronesian traders, the most notable example being the Belitung shipwreck (c.830 CE).

The oldest recovered lashed-lug ships include the Pontian boat of Pahang, Malaysia (c.260–430 CE) and the balangay boat burials of Butuan, Philippines (c.320–1250 CE). Archaeological evidence of lashed-lug ships from 1500 BCE to 1300 CE remains negligible due to the perishable nature of wooden Austronesian ships in the tropics.

Comparison with other traditions
Though the sewn boat technique (but not the lashed lugs) is also used for boats in the western Indian Ocean traditions, it differs in that the stitching in Austronesian boats are discontinuous and only visible from the inside of the hull. This indicates that the sewn boat techniques of the Indian Ocean and Austronesia are not culturally-linked and developed independent of each other. The planks of ancient Austronesian ships were originally joined together using only the sewn boat technique. However, the development of metallurgy in Maritime Southeast Asia in the last two thousand years resulted in the replacement of the sewing technique with internal dowels, as well as increasing use of metal nails.

Early Scandinavian boats used lashings through cleats (lugs) on the hull planks to attach to the ribs of the boat. An example of this tradition is the Nydam boat, dated to 310-320 CE. This particular boat combined metal fastenings of planks, sewn planks and lashed cleats/lugs connecting to ribs. The Gokstad ship also used the lashing of ribs to cleats in the lower parts of the hull, and treenails elsewhere.

See also
Outrigger boat
Crab-claw sail
Tanja sail
Balangay
Sewn boat
Treenailed boat
Mtepe
Hjortspring boat

References

 

Indigenous boats
Ship types
Austronesian culture